Neha Kakkar (born 6 June 1988) is an Indian singer who works in Bollywood. The following is a list of the songs sung by Kakkar.

Hindi film songs

2008

2009

2010

2011

2012

2013

2014

2015

2016

2017

2018

2019

2020

2021

2022

Non-Hindi film songs

Non-film songs

Bengali film songs

2014

2015

Footnotes

References

Kakkar, Neha